Channel Crossing is a 1933 British crime film directed by Milton Rosmer and starring Matheson Lang, Constance Cummings, Anthony Bushell and Nigel Bruce.

It was shot partly on location and at the Lime Grove Studios in Shepherd's Bush. The film's sets were designed by the art director Alfred Junge.

Cast

References

Bibliography
 Low, Rachael. Filmmaking in 1930s Britain. George Allen & Unwin, 1985.
 Wood, Linda. British Films, 1927-1939. British Film Institute, 1986.

External links
 

1933 films
Films directed by Milton Rosmer
British crime films
1933 crime films
Films set in England
Seafaring films
Films shot at Lime Grove Studios
Gainsborough Pictures films
Films scored by Jack Beaver
British black-and-white films
1930s English-language films
1930s British films